Luyanta is a market center in Jaya Prithvi Municipality of Bajhang District in the Seti Zone of north-western Nepal. At the time of the 1991 Nepal census it had a population of 3,450 and had 436 houses in the village.

References

Populated places in Bajhang District